Hercules slaying Antaeus,  1460, is a painting attributed to the Florentine artist Antonio del Pollaiuolo. It is a small image, 6 x 3 1/2 inches, painted in egg tempera on a panel of wood. It is in the Uffizi gallery, Florence.

The painting shows the mythical giant Antaeus, son of Gaia, goddess of the Earth, being crushed to death in the arms of Heracles. Hercules was a Florentine hero, regarded as an image of the Florentine state – its ruthless and warlike spirit – which furthered its political and economic success.

The painting disappeared during the German occupation of Florence towards the end of World War II. It re-emerged in San Francisco, in the mid-1960s, together with another – a depiction of Hercules Slaying the Hydra – and both paintings were returned to Florence.

A series of large canvases illustrating the legends surrounding the figure of Hercules were painted by the Pollaiulo brothers – Antonio and Piero – for the main hall of Cosimo de Medici's palace and this painting appears to be a small-scale copy  of one of the series. In 1494, Antonio Pollaiulo wrote a letter from Rome, the city at the time in the grip of an outbreak of plague, asking to be allowed home to Tuscany and  hoping the Medicis would consent to the request because – "34 years ago I made the Exploits of Hercules which are in the hall of their palace, made by me and my brother."

Giorgio Vasari, the Florentine art historian praised the series of paintings – numbering three in all – and particularly praised Hercules Slaying Antaeus – "In the Medici palace Antonio painted three Hercules scenes of five braccia (about six feet across). In one of them he strangles Antaeus, a most beautiful picture, in which one can really see Hercules's effort in the strangling – And no less care is used for Antaeus, who, held tight in the arms of Hercules, is seen to lose all strength and with open mouth give up the ghost."

References

1460 paintings
Paintings by Antonio del Pollaiuolo